Naarda calliceros is a species of moth in the family Noctuidae first described by Turner in 1932.

References

Herminiinae
Moths described in 1932